Samuel Joseph  (1791 – 1 July 1850) was a British sculptor, working in the early 19th century.

Life
Very little is known about Joseph's early life.

He was a pupil of Peter Rouw, and attended the Royal Academy Schools in 1811, gaining the silver medal there in both 1811 and 1812. In 1815 he won the gold medal for "Eve Supplicating Forgiveness". In 1823 he went to Edinburgh, becoming a founding member of the Royal Scottish Academy in 1826. During this time he taught Alexander Handyside Ritchie.

He left Edinburgh in 1829 to set up a bigger and more prestigious studio in London.

His most famous and noted work is the statue of William Wilberforce in Westminster Abbey, created in 1838. A plaster copy of it also exists in St John's College, Cambridge. He exhibited in the Royal Academy from 1811 to 1846, and the Royal Scottish Academy from 1827 to 1835. He was declared bankrupt in 1848 and forced to sell most of his belongings.

He died in London on 1 July 1850, leaving seven children. The Royal Academy granted a pension to his widow, which continued until her death, 13 years later. A wax portrait of Samuel Joseph by T. Smith was exhibited in 1828 at the Royal Academy.

He is known to have trained the Edinburgh sculptor Peter Slater.

Principal works
 Monument to William Vassall, Battersea Parish Church, 1800
 Bust of his tutor's son, Master T. Rouw, exhibited in Royal Academy, 1811
 Monument to Rev John Tattershall, Otterden, Kent, 1812
 Bust of Edmund Kean for Drury Lane, 1815
 Bust of Lord Beresford, exhibited in Royal Academy, 1819
 Bust of General Sir Lowry Cole, exhibited in Royal Academy, 1819
 Monument to Rev Granville Wheler, Otterden, Kent, 1820
 Bust of Michael Angelo Taylor, exhibited in Royal Scottish Academy, 1821
 Bust of Henry Mackenzie, Scottish National Portrait Gallery, 1822
 Bust of Charles Matthews, National Portrait Gallery, 1822
 Bust of Mr Liston, exhibited at Royal Academy, 1824
 Bust of Lord John Campbell, 1st Baron Campbell, exhibited at Royal Academy, 1824
 Bust of Sir Walter Scott, Preston Hall near Edinburgh, 1825
 Bust of Sir Henry Wellwood, National Gallery, 1825
 Bust of Robert Stevenson (civil engineer), for Bell Rock Lighthouse, 1828
 Bust of the Duke of Argyll, exhibited in Royal Academy, 1830
 Bust of Sir Herbert Taylor, exhibited in Royal Academy, 1830
 Small bronze of John Flaxman, York Art Gallery, 1830
 Bust of King George IV, exhibited in Suffolk Street Galleries, 1831.
 Bust of Davies Gilbert, exhibited in Royal Academy, 1831
 Bust of Rev Jonathan Brooks, exhibited in Liverpool Academy, 1832
 Monument to Rev Latham Wainwright, Great Brickhill, Bucks, 1833
 Bust of Lord Brougham, exhibited in Royal Academy, 1833
 Bust of William Wilberforce, School for the Blind, York, 1833
 Monument to Agnes Wilberforce, East Farleigh, Kent, 1834
 Bust of King William IV, Penshurst Place, Kent, 1834
 Bust of King William IV, United Service Club, London, 1834
 Bust of Sir William Franklin, Rochester Cathedral, 1837
 Bust of Lady De L'Isle and Dudley, Penshurst Place, Kent, 1838
 Statue of William Wilberforce in Westminster Abbey, 1838
 Bust of Colonel Gurwood, Apsley House, 1840
 Bust of Rev Archibald Alison, Scottish National Portrait Gallery, 1841
 Bust of Sir David Wilkie, National Gallery of Scotland, 1842
 Statue of Sir David Wilkie in Tate Gallery, 1843
 Bust of the Earl of Shannon, exhibited in Royal Academy, 1844
 Statue of Hon Elizabeth Eliot, Port Eliot, Cornwall exhibited in Royal Academy, 1838
 Statue of Sir Hugh Myddelton, Royal Exchange, London, 1845
 Bronze bust of Prof Dugald Stewart, Scottish National Portrait Gallery, date unknown
 Bust of William Huskisson, Petworth House, date unknown
 Bust of Voltaire, Elvetham Hall, Hants, date unknown
 Bust of James Gregory (physician), Old College, University of Edinburgh, date unknown

References

Gunnis, Rupert (1953). Dictionary of British Sculptors 1660–1851

External links

Samuel Joseph on National Galleries Scotland

1791 births
1850 deaths
19th-century British sculptors
19th-century English male artists
Alumni of the Royal Academy Schools
English male sculptors